Gladys Helena Carson (8 February 1903 – 17 November 1987), later known by her married name Gladys Hewitt, was an English competitive swimmer who represented Great Britain at the 1924 Summer Olympics in Paris.  She won a bronze medal for coming third in the event final of the women's 200-metre breaststroke in a time of 3:35.4, finishing behind fellow Briton Lucy Morton (3:32.2) and American Agnes Geraghty (3:34.0).

Carson was born in Leicester, England.

See also
 List of Olympic medalists in swimming (women)

References

External links
 

1903 births
1987 deaths
English female swimmers
Female breaststroke swimmers
Olympic swimmers of Great Britain
Swimmers at the 1924 Summer Olympics
Olympic bronze medallists for Great Britain
Olympic bronze medalists in swimming
Medalists at the 1924 Summer Olympics
20th-century English women